The 23 municipalities of the Pirkanmaa Region in Finland are divided into five sub-regions.


North Western Pirkanmaa sub-region 
Ikaalinen (Ikalis)
Kihniö
Parkano

Southern Pirkanmaa sub-region 
Akaa (Ackas)
Urjala
Valkeakoski

South Western Pirkanmaa sub-region 
Punkalaidun
Sastamala

Tampere sub-region 

Hämeenkyrö (Tavastkyro)
Kangasala
Kuhmoinen (Kuhmois)
Lempäälä
Nokia
Orivesi
Pälkäne
Pirkkala (Birkala)
Tampere (Tammerfors)
Vesilahti
Ylöjärvi

Upper Pirkanmaa sub-region 
Juupajoki
Mänttä-Vilppula
Ruovesi
Virrat (Virdois)

See also 
Western Finland
Regions of Western Finland

External links